Çiçekli — Turkiyaning Adana viloyati Ceyhan tumanidagi qishloqlardan biri.

Manbalar

Villages in Ceyhan District